McCausland is a city in Butler Township, Scott County, Iowa, United States. The population was 313 at the time of the 2020 census.

The city was founded in 1882 by D.C. McCausland, a landowner and horse trader.

Geography
McCausland is located at  (41.744804, −90.442613).

Demographics

2010 census
As of the census of 2010, there were 291 people, 115 households, and 86 families living in the city. The racial makeup of the city was 97.9% White, 0.7% from other races, and 1.4% from two or more races. Hispanic or Latino of any race were 1.7% of the population.

There were 115 households, of which 36.5% had children under the age of 18 living with them, 66.1% were married couples living together, 5.2% had a female householder with no husband present, 3.5% had a male householder with no wife present, and 25.2% were non-families. 20.0% of all households were made up of individuals, and 7% had someone living alone who was 65 years of age or older. The average household size was 2.53 and the average family size was 2.90.

The median age in the city was 40.1 years. 22.3% of residents were under the age of 18; 6.3% were between the ages of 18 and 24; 29.9% were from 25 to 44; 28.8% were from 45 to 64; and 12.7% were 65 years of age or older. The gender makeup of the city was 49.8% male and 50.2% female.

2000 census
As of the census of 2000, there were 299 people, 117 households, and 84 families living in the city. The racial makeup of the city was 99.00% White, 0.33% Native American, and 0.67% from two or more races. Hispanic or Latino of any race were 0.33% of the population.

There were 117 households, out of which 36.8% had children under the age of 18 living with them, 62.4% were married couples living together, 6.8% had a female householder with no husband present, and 27.4% were non-families. 23.9% of all households were made up of individuals, and 11.1% had someone living alone who was 65 years of age or older. The average household size was 2.56 and the average family size was 3.06.

25.4% are under the age of 18, 9.0% from 18 to 24, 31.1% from 25 to 44, 24.4% from 45 to 64, and 10.0% who were 65 years of age or older. The median age was 34 years. For every 100 females, there were 104.8 males. For every 100 females age 18 and over, there were 99.1 males.

The median income for a household in the city was $34,531, and the median income for a family was $40,313. Males had a median income of $26,667 versus $24,688 for females. The per capita income for the city was $22,426. About 1.4% of families and 6.3% of the population were below the poverty line, including 11.7% of those under the age of eighteen and 3.0% of those 65 or over.

Education
McCausland is part of the North Scott Community School District, which spans  in northern Scott County.

References

Cities in Iowa
Cities in Scott County, Iowa
Cities in the Quad Cities